Stevenia is the scientific name of two genera of organisms and may refer to:
 Stevenia (fly), a genus of insects in the family Rhinophoridae
 Stevenia (plant), a genus of plants in the family Brassicaceae